Cornwall Airport Newquay  is the main commercial airport for Cornwall, United Kingdom, located at Mawgan in Pydar,  northeast of the town of Newquay on Cornwall's north coast. Its runway was operated by RAF St Mawgan before 2008, and is now owned by Cornwall Council and operated by Cornwall Airport Ltd.

The airport handled 461,300 passengers in 2017, a 24.2% increase over the previous year. Newquay has a CAA Public Use Aerodrome Licence that allows flights for the public transport of passengers or for flying instruction. The Cornwall Air Ambulance is based at the airport. Since 2012, the airport has hosted the Aerohub enterprise zone.

The 2,744 metre (9,003 ft) runway can take the largest and fastest of civil and military aircraft, having been built and maintained for decades as an RAF maritime operations base. The US Navy were present with the USN AWD storage facility and Joint Maritime Facility. With the end of the Cold War and changes in American political priorities, the Americans pulled out of all involvement with the base by the end of 2009. The last RAF flying squadron based at St Mawgan was 203(R) Squadron which moved out in 2008, while part of the site continues to be used by the RAF.

The airport is also the base for Spaceport Cornwall / Virgin Orbit space satellite launches.

History

Military use
The airfield was opened in 1933 as a civilian facility, but was requisitioned at the outbreak of World War II and named RAF Trebelzue to support other bases in the Cornwall area. The base was renamed RAF St Mawgan in 1943, after expansion. The facility was then handed to the USAAF and there were a number of improvements, including the building of a new control tower and expansion of the current runway. The airfield was put under maintenance in 1947, and reopened as a Coastal Command base in 1951.

Since 1951, aircraft squadron which have operated at the station have included 7 Sqn., 22 Sqn., 203 Sqn. (Sea King OCU, 1996–2008); 220 Sqn (later renamed 201); 228 Sqn. (later renamed 206), both Long Range Reconnaissance Squadrons; No. 42 Squadron RAF (BAe Nimrod) (disbanded 1992), No. 236 Operational Conversion Unit RAF, the Nimrod front-line conversion-to-type unit (1970-1992). In addition, Royal Air Force Regiment squadrons No. 1 Squadron RAF Regiment and 2625 Sqn (Royal Auxiliary Air Force) were present. 2625 Sqn was disbanded on 1 November 2006, whilst 1 Sqn RAF Regt relocated to RAF Honington. The others relocated or closed. In 2005, RAF St Mawgan was one of the bases shortlisted to house the new Joint Combat Aircraft (JCA) in 2013, but in November 2005, it was announced by Minister of State for the Armed Forces Adam Ingram that the operation would be based from Scotland. Helicopter maintenance (HMF) also ceased here in late 2006.

Flying operations at RAF St Mawgan (on the opposite side of the runway to the civil terminal) ceased in December 2008.

Transition to fully civilian airport

In 2006, the airport introduced a £5 per passenger airport development fee, payable by all departing passengers via an ATM type machine prior to passing security. This resulted in Monarch Airlines axing its route from the airport (to Málaga) and in Ryanair reducing the number of flights, though this was later restored. In 2015, it was announced that the £5 development fee would be scrapped in March 2016.

Before 2008, the airport operated as dual civilian/military airport, with the civilian side known as Newquay Civil Airport. In 2008, the airport closed from 1 to 19 December, to allow time for the takeover of the airfield navigation services (i.e. air traffic control) from RAF St Mawgan and to fully meet CAA standards. Following further inspections by the CAA, flights recommenced on 20 December 2008.

By virtue of a statutory instrument issued on 22 September 2009, Newquay Airport is subject to current airport bylaws, per section 63 of the Airports Act 1986.

An extension opened in 2006 increased the terminal's size by 20%, allowing the airport to handle up to 450,000 passengers a year. In January 2008, Cornwall County Council approved plans for an expanded arrivals hall and departure lounge; a new retail outlet; a business lounge; and new airfield structures. In May 2008, the new arrivals and baggage reclaim area was opened; unlike the old arrivals hall, this allowed domestic and international flights to be processed simultaneously. It also added a gate to the departure lounge.

The expansion of the airport was criticised in 2007 by a number of environmental groups. This opposition was based not only on environmental concerns (given that the majority of flights are short-haul and to destinations that could be served by rail), but also socio-economic concerns that airport expansion would lead to a greater demand for second homes in Cornwall, adding to already inflated local house prices.

Civil airport operation 
The Irish low-cost carrier Ryanair pulled out of the airport in 2006, ceasing flights to London Stansted and Girona-Costa Brava Airport. In November 2008, Newquay Airport released its draft master plan, outlining its plans for the airport until 2030.

In July 2011, the airport's main carrier, Air Southwest, announced the end of all flights from Newquay effective 30 September 2011, leaving the airport with only three year-round scheduled routes.

In May 2013, Flybe announced it would cease flying to Gatwick, leaving Newquay with year-round flights to just the Isles of Scilly and Manchester. On 2 December 2013, Flybe announced they had agreed a deal with Newquay which would secure the future of the Gatwick route until the end of October 2014, so that a public service obligation (PSO) subsidy could be finalised. Under the new deal Flybe was to operate two daily flights, with the afternoon service being dropped.

Ryanair returned to the airport in April 2016, after the £5 development fee was scrapped.

On 5 March 2020, Flybe ceased trading, leaving Cornwall with no year-round direct flights to London once again. British Airways announced a six-flight-per-week summer schedule to London, commencing initially in Easter 2020. However, the COVID-19 pandemic's impacts on aviation resulted in the service launch being postponed. The service was eventually launched on 24 July 2020, albeit as a year-round service under a Public Service Obligation Emergency Order which lasts until February 2021. During this period, Department for Transport will run the tender process for the four-year contract which will begin in March 2021.

Aerohub enterprise zone
In August 2011, the UK government announced that the airport's bid to host an enterprise zone for aerospace businesses had been successful. The Aerohub enterprise zone was launched in April 2012. In September 2014, the UK's Homes and Communities Agency and the European Regional Development Fund agreed to fund the construction of a £6million Aerohub Business Park. Organisations attracted to Aerohub by 2014 included Classic Air Force and the Bloodhound Supersonic Car project.

From 29 March 2013, Classic Air Force has operated from the airport using a variety of aircraft, including the world's oldest flying British jet aircraft and the only flying Gloster Meteor T7. From April 2013 until 2017, it has also operated a museum in the  Hangar 404, which was previously used to service the Hawker Siddeley Nimrods of RAF St Mawgan. Some of the now-closed museum's exhibits remain elsewhere on the airfield under different ownership. Since 2015, a new venture known as 'Cornwall Aviation Heritage Centre' (CAHC), was opened at the Aerohub.

Plans have been submitted to build the world's deepest artificial pool in Cornwall to train astronauts and help advance undersea robotics.

A Cycle-hub is due to be built near Newquay Aerohub Business Park on council-owned land and is the result of a partnership between British Cycling, Cornwall Council and Sport England.

Potential future uses
In September 2013, the National Aeronautical Centre (NAC) at Aberporth Airport announced it would use Newquay as its second airport for testing unmanned aerial vehicles (UAV). The NAC said it was attracted by the length of the runway and the facilities of Aerohub. The test flights would require  of segregated airspace over the sea. In March 2015, the airport reported that the establishment of this segregated area had not yet been agreed with the Department for Transport, who stated that negotiations with international bodies to create an appropriate regulatory framework for UAVs were still taking place.

In July 2014, Newquay was one of eight airports shortlisted by the Civil Aviation Authority as a possible site for a British commercial spaceport. The shortlist was reduced to six airports in March 2015, with Newquay still a candidate. The selection process was abandoned in May 2016 after the Department for Transport announced it would be creating regulatory conditions allowing any suitable location wishing to become a spaceport.

Airlines and destinations
The following airlines operate regular scheduled flights to and from Newquay:

Traffic statistics

Passengers and movements

Routes

Spaceport Cornwall

In June 2019, the UK government and Cornwall Council announced they were prepared to invest up to £20M into the airport to create the Spaceport Cornwall as a base for Virgin Orbit. The system, in support of the UK space industry, would launch satellite carrying rockets to space from under the wing of a converted Virgin Atlantic Boeing 747 jumbo jet by the early 2020s dependent on the business case put forward. On 5 November 2019, the UK Space Agency announced that it would provide £7.35M to establish Virgin Orbit operations at Spaceport Cornwall.

On 30 September 2022, Spaceport Cornwall was officially launched, with the opening of their Space Systems Integration Facility (SSIF). The SSIF  will house the LauncherOne rocket and a clean room for handling payloads and integrating them into the fairing of the rocket. The Spaceport will eventually be home to the Centre for Space Technologies consisting of the SSIF and a soon to be completed Space Systems Operation Facility, an adjacent R&D work and office space by early 2023. The Spaceport is intended to be a hub for innovation within the local area working with new businesses and to take a global lead in responsible launch, working with the University of Exeter to achieve the ambition of being the first spaceport globally to reach Net Zero.

Future plans include having rockets manufactured on-site rather than transported in from the US. A mission control centre is also being built with plans for mission control to direct three missions a year.

On 16 November 2022, it was announced that Spaceport Cornwall had been granted an operating licence by the Civil Aviation Authority (CAA) allowing it to send satellites into space. The first launch from the spaceport using the Virgin Orbit LauncherOne system took place on 9 January 2023 with a payload of several small satellites. However, after being released by its carrier aircraft, the  LauncherOne rocket suffered an upper stage engine anomaly at approximately 180km (112 miles) altitude on its ascent into space, failing to achieve orbit and resulting in the loss of the payload. Virgin Orbit plans to try for another launch from Spaceport Cornwall later in 2023.

Launches

Based units
Newquay airport is home to:
Cornwall Air Ambulance since its introduction in 1987.  the trust operates an AgustaWestland AW169.
HM Coastguard have a small operations base and operate two Sikorsky S92 helicopters from Newquay Airport.

References

External links

 Aerohub Enterprise Zone

Newquay
Airports in Cornwall
Companies owned by municipalities of England